Lucy Danziger is a veteran magazine editor, writer, well-being expert and strategic content creator who is CEO of 10 Point Ventures, a digital content studio that works with brands, startups and media companies to help them reach their business goals. Danziger is the former American editor-in-chief of Self magazine and recently left her post as the Editorial Director of The Beet, a guide to plant-based healthy living. Danziger served as an editor-in-chief of Condé Nast Publications' Self from 2001 until 2014. After leaving Condé Nast she built and launched Hinted, a social shopping platform that allows users to make shoppable wish lists and return to purchase items when they want to or when their saved “hints” go on sale.

Background and Career 
After graduating from Phillips Academy in Andover, Massachusetts in 1978 and with a Bachelor of Science in Art History from Harvard in 1982, Danziger worked as a general assignment reporter at the Star-Ledger of Newark for four years, covering everything from crime to court trials, business stories and local City Desk stories. She then became an associate editor at New York magazine. Later, she worked at the New York-based weekly 7 Days as the founding Managing Editor. She also served as the founding editor in chief of Women's Sports & Fitness from 1997 to 2000 and as an editor in the Style News Department at The New York Times before becoming editor-in-chief at Self in 2001. Danziger has written for numerous publications including The New York Times, The Wall Street Journal, Vogue, Outside, Condé Nast Traveler, Skiing, Allure, Time and USA Today. Danziger has appeared on several television shows, including Today, The View and Good Morning America.

Danziger oversaw the growth of Self.com to become a larger presence than the print magazine, and grew the website and magazine together to more than 12 million monthly unique users and readers. During her time at Self.com the Self Challenge became an online juggernaut, signing up hundreds of thousands of users to the three-month fitness program each Spring. Self, co-founder of the Pink Ribbon for breast cancer awareness, advocacy and prevention, also launched special issues dedicated to other health topics such as skin cancer, anti-smoking and smoking-cessation, and other ways women could take better care of their physical, mental and emotional health. After leaving SELF, Danziger continued to write, edit and advocate for healthy lifestyle changes and has launched several companies dedicated to giving women agency over their futures.

She launched Hinted as a social shopping platform, app and personal tool to allow users to save to wish lists what consumers want as they browse and shop. They save fashion, beauty, home items, as well as experiences like trips and wellbeing purchases such as gym classes. The platform launched an iOS app in late 20178 and surpassed over 300,000 users by the following year.

In 2019 Danziger launched a plant-based website called The Beet, for eating more plants. The site launched officially in January 2020 and grew to over 1 million unique visitors by May, 2020 and then nearly doubled by June of 2021. The Beet covers how to eat more plant-based foods for the sake of health and the environment. The Beet currently publishes 5 stories daily, including Recipe of the Day, has an app and a daily newsletter, The Daily Beet, with 100,000 subscribers.

References

External links
 SELF Magazine
 True to my SELF blog
 "Yahoo! Health Experts"

American women writers
Harvard University alumni
Living people
Phillips Academy alumni
American women chief executives
American technology chief executives
Year of birth missing (living people)
Self (magazine) editors
21st-century American women
Presidents of the American Society of Magazine Editors